The 2022–23 Czech 1. liga season is the 30th season of the Czech 1. liga, the second level of ice hockey in the Czech Republic. 14 teams participate in the league.

Team changes

Regular season

Standings
Each team played 52 games, playing each of the other thirteen teams four times. Points were awarded for each game, where three points were awarded for winning in regulation time, two points for winning in overtime or shootout, one point for losing in overtime or shootout, and zero points for losing in regulation time. At the end of the regular season, the team that finished with the most points was crowned the league champion.

Playoffs
Ten teams qualify for the playoffs: the top six teams in the regular season have a bye to the quarterfinals, while teams ranked seventh to tenth meet each other (7 versus 10, 8 versus 9) in a preliminary playoff round.

Bracket

Wild card round

Quarterfinals

Semifinals

Finals

Final rankings

References

External links
Official website

Czech 1. Liga seasons
Czech
2022–23 in Czech ice hockey leagues